Cyberspace 3000 is a comic book that was published by the Marvel UK imprint of Marvel Comics from 1993 to 1994. The series follows the adventures of the 31st century spaceship Sol III, which has fled Earth with a cargo of refugees.

Although the series is mostly science fiction, it is also tied to the Marvel Universe and occasionally features appearances by established Marvel characters such as Galactus, the Silver Surfer and Adam Warlock, as well as a version of the Marvel UK heroine Dark Angel.

Plot
The premise of Cyberspace 3000 is closely linked to another Marvel series, the Guardians of the Galaxy, with the Sol III ship fleeing an invasion by the alien Badoon. This connection is emphasized by references to related characters appearing in some characters dialogue - crewmembers swear "by Korvac's mother" and also "thank Korvac" for a lucky escape.

Characters
 Captain Jennifer Cabre-Rios
 Shan O'Meara
 Commander Yan Onanwro
 Doctor S'Rell
 Sol, the onboard computer system. Described as a 'Mark IV' A.I. system.
 The Clan Cyorse, a fanatical religious order.
 The Trilexia, an insectoid alien race

References

 Sol III  at the Appendix to the Handbook of the Marvel Universe
 Gamble  at the Appendix to the Handbook of the Marvel Universe

Cyberspace 3000 at the Unofficial Handbook of Marvel Comics Creators

Cyberspace 3000 at the Big Comic Book DataBase

External links
 Captain Cabre-Rios profile

1993 comics debuts